Rahimi is an Iranian surname. Notable people with the surname include:

 Abouzar Rahimi, Iranian footballer
 Alireza Rahimi (footballer), Iranian football administrator and former footballer
 Afshin Rahimi, American dermatologist
 Amin Hossein Rahimi, Iranian politician
 Atiq Rahimi, French-Afghan writer
 Daniel Rahimi, Swedish-Iranian professional ice hockey defenceman
 Hassan Rahimi, Iranian wrestler
 Leila Rahimi, American sportscaster
 Medalion Rahimi, American actress.
 Mehdi Rahimi, Iranian general executed upon the Islamic revolution in 1979.
 Mohammad-Reza Rahimi, Iranian former Vice President
 Omid Rahimi, American anatomist
 Ramin Rahimi, Iranian songwriter

Iranian-language surnames